Adrian Watt (born December 29, 1947) is an American former ski jumper who competed in the 1968 Winter Olympics.

References

1947 births
Living people
Sportspeople from Omaha, Nebraska
American male ski jumpers
Olympic ski jumpers of the United States
Ski jumpers at the 1968 Winter Olympics